The Reich Ministry of Justice was a Ministry of Germany during the Weimar Republic and subsequently the Nazi period. It was the successor of the Reichsjustizamt. It was abolished in 1945, when the Allied forces took over the administration of Germany at the end of World War II.

In 1949, its former functions were taken over in West Germany (the Federal Republic of Germany) by the Federal Ministry of Justice (German: Bundesministerium der Justiz) and in East Germany (the German Democratic Republic) by the Ministry of Justice of the GDR (German: Ministerium der Justiz der DDR).

Weimar Republic
Reich Ministries of Nazi Germany